John Edward Crowther (1863–1931) was a businessman and philanthropist who ran a large operation based at Bank Bottom Mill and made a number of charitable donations to the village and people of Marsden, West Riding of Yorkshire.

Early life
Crowther was born in 1863 in the West Riding of Yorkshire. He was the son of John Crowther, a clothier (c1820-1865) and his wife Martha. He had, four brothers, Joseph, William, Elon Crowther, all of whom would go into the mill business.

Career

Crowther owned and ran the family company John Edward Crowther Ltd based at Bank Bottom Mill, which in the early part of the 20th century was one of the largest cloth producing mills owned by a single individual in the world.

He was responsible for a number of charitable donations to the town of Marsden, such as the purchase and donation of an ambulance in 1912. After the Great War, in 1930, Crowther donated land for the clubhouse of the local chapter of the British Legion. He also helped to maintain a curate at the parish church and helped pay for the peal of bells in the church tower.

Death and legacy
On 7 April 1930 his wife died. In 1931 the economic downturn caused by the Great Depression caused the mill to work short time, and on 4 July 1931 Crowther took his own life. When he was cremated on 8 July, the mills in Marsden closed, shops shut and drew their blinds, and flags flew at half mast on the mills and other buildings in the town.

The company that bears his name, John Edward Crowther Ltd, remains in business today, manufacturing textiles and also dealing in real estate.

Notes

Further reading
 Armstrong, Thomas; The Crowthers of Bankdam, HarperCollins (1991).  
 Marsden History Group, Marsden – Then and Now: A Photographic Journey, 
 Pearson, Irene E., Marsden Through the Ages, (1984),

External links
www.marsdenhistory.co.uk Retrieved 4 January 2014
Crowthers at Marsden History Retrieved 30 December 2018
 "Picture of the Week: John Crowther mill memories in the shadow of the moors", Huddersfield Daily Examiner, 24 May 2012. Retrieved 31 December 2013
 Pearson, Irene E., Marsden Through the Ages, (1984),  Retrieved 4 January 2014

1863 births
1931 deaths
People from Marsden, West Yorkshire
Businesspeople from Yorkshire
1931 suicides
Suicides in England